Clostridium scindens is a species of bacteria in the genus Clostridium that are found in the human gut. 

Like other members of the genus Clostridium, C. scindens is a Gram positive spore-forming anaerobe. 

Clostridium scindens is capable of converting primary bile acids to toxic secondary bile acids, as well as converting glucocorticoids to androgens by side-chain cleavage.

Clostridium scindens may become established in the human colon, and its presence is associated with resistance to infection by Clostridioides difficile, due to production of secondary bile acids which inhibit the growth of C. difficile.

References

External links
Type strain of Clostridium scindens at BacDive -  the Bacterial Diversity Metadatabase

scindens
Bacteria described in 1935